The Mascareen Peninsula (pronounced: (mas-kuh-REEN)) is located in Saint George Parish, Charlotte County, in southwestern New Brunswick, Canada. It is situated on the eastern side of Passamaquoddy Bay, opposite St. Andrews. The villages of L'Etete, L'Etang, and Back Bay are located on the Mascareen Peninsula.

References

Landforms of Charlotte County, New Brunswick
Peninsulas of New Brunswick